Plutella armoraciae is a moth of the  family Plutellidae. It is found in north-western North America.

The wingspan is about 18 mm. Adults superficially look like a very pale Plutella xylostella.

The larvae feed on Armoracia species.

References

Moths described in 1912
Plutellidae